Idiodes albistriga is a moth of the  family Geometridae. It is found in Madagascar.

The forewings of this species are dull coppery red, thickly covered with dark flecks, the veins towards hindmargin are clearer red; costa with some bright pale dots.
The hindwings are paler, more pinkish, except towards hindmargin, with a cloudy cellspot, a faintly curved postmedian and a more strongly submarginal line. The underside is duller red, without the coppery tinge.

The head and thorax are coppery red, the abdomen reddish grey.

The holotype was collected North-East of Fianarantsoa in the Forrest of Ivohimanitra (North of Ambohimanga Sud).

References

Ennominae
Moths described in 1899
Lepidoptera of Madagascar
Moths of Madagascar
Moths of Africa